Iver Paul Fredrik Holter (13 December 1850 – 27 January 1941) was a Norwegian composer. He was conductor and music director of the Oslo Philharmonic for a quarter century.

Biography
Iver Paul Fredrik Holter was born in Gausdal, Oppland, Norway. His parents were  Caspar Georg Holter (1812–1880), a minister, and Caroline Theodora Børresen (1818–1857). He spent his adolescence at Gjerpen in Skien, where he received violin lessons from the German-born organist Friederich Wilhelm Rojahn (1820-1886). Holter had originally studied medicine but by 1876, he changed career paths to become a musician. He first studied music with Johan Svendsen and afterward in Leipzig (1876–79). He continued his music studies in Berlin (1879–1881).

In the autumn of 1882, he followed Edvard Grieg as conductor for the Bergen Philharmonic Orchestra. In autumn 1886, he became music director and conductor of the Oslo Philharmonic, a position he held for 25 years. Holter suggested the founding of a city orchestra which could play at municipal festivities, concerts and in the theatre, and as a result of this, the orchestra gained municipal support from 1889.

Holter became a central figure in the city's musical life. In 1890 he founded the Oslo Bys Orchestra, and he was conductor for the Music Association (Musikkforeningen) in Oslo for a quarter century. During the period 1900 to 1906 he edited the music magazine, Nordisk Musik-Revue. In 1912, he was one of the founders Norwegian Musical Artists' Society (Norsk Tonekunstnersamfund).

Holter composed piano music, songs and choral music, including a series of cantatas for various major and minor events. As a composer, he followed the classic-romantic ideals. His numerous compositions include a symphony, string quartets, a violin concerto, cantatas, songs and choral pieces.  Most notably,  he wrote music for Goethe's Götz von Berlichingen and the orchestral work St. Hans Kveld.

He was buried in Vår Frelsers gravlund in Oslo, Norway.

Selected works
 Bagatellen für das Pianoforte. 1879
 2 String Quartets. 1880, ?
 Vier Gesänge für eine mittlere Stimme mit Begleitung des Pianoforte. 1881
  Til Fædrelandet (cantata, text by T. Caspari). 1895
  Kantate ved den 7de store Sangerfest (text by M. Rolfsen). 1896
  Nürnberg (cantata, text by T. Caspari). 1898
  Kantate ved indvielsen af Kristiania handelsstands forenings nye hus (text by C. Dysthe). 1912
  Kristiania-Kantate (text by T. Caspari). 1924
  Olavskantate (text by T. Caspari). 1930
  Violin Concerto in A minor 
  Symphony in F major

References

External links
 
 

1850 births
1941 deaths
19th-century classical composers
19th-century conductors (music)
19th-century Norwegian composers
20th-century classical composers
20th-century conductors (music)
20th-century Norwegian male musicians
20th-century Norwegian composers
Burials at the Cemetery of Our Saviour
Male conductors (music)
Norwegian classical composers
Norwegian conductors (music)
Norwegian male classical composers
Norwegian Romantic composers
People from Gausdal
Musicians from Skien
Place of death missing
Norwegian Association for Women's Rights people